Matt Macdonald (born 15 March 1999) is a New Zealand rower. He won a gold medal in the men's eight event at the 2020 Summer Olympics.

Prior to the 2020 Olympic Games, he finished second in the men's coxless four at the 2017 Junior World Rowing Championships; third in the same boat class at the 2018 Under-23 World Rowing Championships; fifteenth in the same boat class at the 2018 World Rowing Championships; and 6th in the men's eight at the 2019 World Rowing Championships. He is from Auckland, New Zealand and began rowing at Auckland Grammar School. He has also represented Auckland Rowing Club and North Shore Rowing Club. He lives in Cambridge and is studying for a Bachelor of Sport and Recreation at Massey University.

References

External links
 

1999 births
Living people
New Zealand male rowers
Olympic rowers of New Zealand
Rowers at the 2020 Summer Olympics
Rowers from Auckland
Olympic gold medalists for New Zealand in rowing
Medalists at the 2020 Summer Olympics